Margarita Bogdanova (born 1 January 1972) is a Russian rower. She competed in the women's quadruple sculls event at the 1996 Summer Olympics.

References

1972 births
Living people
Russian female rowers
Olympic rowers of Russia
Rowers at the 1996 Summer Olympics
Place of birth missing (living people)